The Order of the Queen of Sheba was originally instituted as a ladies' order in 1922 in the Ethiopian Empire by Empress Zawditu and would later become the diplomatic symbol of a holy pact.

Classes
The Order of the Queen of Sheba is presented in the following classes:

 Collar (only in favor of members of the royal family)
 Grand Cordon (limited to 25)
 Grand Officer (limited to 45)
 Commander (limited to 55)
 Officer (unlimited)
 Member or Chevalier (i.e. "Knight"; also unlimited)

References

External links
 Plaque of the order
 Badge of the order

Queen of Sheba
Queen of Sheba
Orders, decorations, and medals of Ethiopia
Awards established in 1922
Orders of chivalry awarded to heads of state, consorts and sovereign family members
1922 establishments in Africa